"Festa" is MAX's 25th single on the Avex Trax label. It is their second single to be released in a copy-protected format. The title track was used as the commercial song for Ebara's line of salad dressing products, Goma Shiburi Kaori no Dressing. The group appeared in a series of commercials for the brand, although not all of them featured "Festa."

Track list

Production

Music 
 Recording Director: Motohiko Kohno
 Mixing: Kohji Morimoto
 Recording: Shigeki Kashii, Takahiro Mikami, Junichi Hourin
 Mastering: Shigeo Miyamoto

Artwork 
 Art direction: Shinichi Hara
 Design: Tomokazu Suzuki
 Photography: Zigen
 Styling: Akarumi Someya
 Hair & Make-up: Maki Tawa
 Costume support: Gals Ville, Lauren Hills, XOXO kiss kiss, Esperanza

Charts
Oricon Sales Chart (Japan)

2003 singles
MAX (band) songs
2003 songs